Shawnee Township is one of the twelve townships of Allen County, Ohio, United States. As of the 2010 census the population was 12,433.

Geography
Located in the southern part of the county, it borders the following townships:
American Township - north
Bath Township - northeast corner
Perry Township - east
Duchouquet Township, Auglaize County - south
Logan Township, Auglaize County - southwest
Amanda Township - northwest

Part of Lima is located in northeastern Shawnee Township. Fort Shawnee is located in the township's eastern sections; currently unincorporated, it was a village until its dissolution in 2012.

Name and history
It is the only Shawnee Township statewide.

One historic site in the township, the Griffith Breese Farm, is listed on the National Register of Historic Places.

Government
The township is governed by a three-member board of trustees, who are elected in November of odd-numbered years to a four-year term beginning on the following January 1. Two are elected in the year after the presidential election and one is elected in the year before it. There is also an elected township fiscal officer, who serves a four-year term beginning on April 1 of the year after the election, which is held in November of the year before the presidential election. Vacancies in the fiscal officership or on the board of trustees are filled by the remaining trustees.

References

External links
Township website
County website

Townships in Allen County, Ohio
Townships in Ohio